The Urraca Formation is a geologic formation in Panama. The reefal limestone formation preserves coral fossils dating to the Early Pleistocene.

See also 
 List of fossiliferous stratigraphic units in Panama

References

Further reading 
 J. S. Klaus, D. F. McNeill, A. F. Budd and A. G. Coates. 2012. Neogene reef coral assemblages of the Bocas del Toro region, Panama: the rise of Acropora palmata. Coral Reefs 31(1):191-203

Geologic formations of Panama
Pleistocene Panama
Limestone formations
Reef deposits
Formations